The Wright StreetDeck is an integral double-decker bus that was manufactured by Wrightbus from 2014, originally delivered as standard with a Daimler OM934 diesel engine. Hybrid-electric, full-electric and hydrogen-powered variants have subsequently been produced. 

Demonstrators and prototypes were placed in service by Arriva Derby, Arriva London, First Greater Manchester, First South Yorkshire, London Central and Transdev in Harrogate in 2014 and 2015. The first production examples entered service with Brighton & Hove in 2015. Production was briefly suspended due to Wrightbus entering administration in September 2019.

As of December 2022, 1,265 StreetDecks have been built across all double-deck variants, primarily for FirstGroup and Go-Ahead Group subsidiaries. Other Operators include Reading Buses, Arriva Yorkshire, Arriva London, Oxford Bus Company, Thames Travel, Diamond Bus North West, Vision Bus and Bus Vannin on the Isle of Man also operate Streetdeck Buses.

Variants

StreetDeck 

The majority of StreetDecks produced have been the standard diesel variant, fitted with a Daimler OM934 5.1 litre, 4-cylinder Euro 6 diesel engine competing mainly with the Volvo B5TL and Alexander Dennis Enviro400 MMC. The first five prototype demonstrators to be produced were fitted with a front end similar in appearance to the outgoing Wright Eclipse Gemini 2 double-decker, before Wrightbus' new standard 'Stealth' front Wright Eclipse Gemini 3 end styling was fitted to production examples. The diesel StreetDeck was later renamed to the Streetdeck Ultroliner in June 2021.

The first prototype StreetDeck (Reg: FJ64ETZ, Fleet Number 4600) entered service with Arriva Derby, built to Sapphire specification for route 38, in November 2014. This was followed by further examples with First South Yorkshire, First Greater Manchester, Arriva London and Go North East in January 2015 and London Central in February 2015.

The first order for StreetDecks was made by Brighton & Hove for 24 that entered service on the Coaster service between Brighton and Eastbourne in March and April 2015; as of June 2018, Brighton & Hove have taken delivery of 82 examples.

The FirstGroup have been the largest customer for the diesel StreetDeck, taking delivery of 194 examples as of June 2018. Five first entered service with First Leicester in 2015, followed by an additional 29 being delivered in 2016. 22 entered service on First South Yorkshire's flagship X1 Steel Link service in September 2016, having entered service on route X78 from Sheffield to Doncaster in November 2015 due to delays in the opening of the Bus Rapid Transit North.  

The first production examples for a Transport for London contractor entered service with Arriva London in July 2016 on route 340.

StreetDeck Micro Hybrid / Ultroliner 
The StreetDeck is also available with the same Wrightbus Micro Hybrid technology as was first provided in the StreetLite single-decker. The Micro Hybrid package consists of a flywheel and regenerative braking in the bus, which provides electricity used to power the interior lights and compressed air systems, saving up to 10% in fuel costs compared to the standard diesel StreetDeck.

In 2021, the Wright StreetDeck Micro Hybrid was renamed as the Wright StreetDeck Ultroliner in line with the Electroliner and the Hydroliner.

First West Yorkshire are a popular operator of diesel StreetDecks within the FirstGroup, operating over 120 of the type from 2018 onwards under First Leeds' LeedsCity brand, with 28 StreetDecks also entering service with First Bradford in March 2022.

The diesel StreetDeck has proven especially popular across the FirstGroup following Wrightbus' rescue from bankruptcy. The type was purchased by First West of England, with 27 were delivered with revived Badgerline branding in early 2022; First Eastern Counties, where 15 low-height StreetDecks began to be delivered for their Ipswich Reds operation from October 2022; First York, who took 20 for city and University of York services, and First Potteries, where twelve of the type, ten branded for the 'Constellation' serving Keele University, were delivered in December 2022.

Go-Ahead Group have been the second largest customer, with the Oxford Bus Company taking delivery of 41 StreetDecks between 2015 and 2017 for its city 3 (yellow), city 5 (pink), city 8&9 (orange) and Oxford park & ride services. Go North East purchased 26 StreetDecks for its Castles Express X21 and the Angel 21 services between 2016 and 2018. In June 2019, Go North East announced a further order of 31 StreetDecks for its new X-Lines network of express routes. The buses are expected to enter service from Spring 2020. The order includes the first StreetDeck in the UK to feature Daimler's 6-cylinder engine. Ten examples of the 6-cylinder engined variants have also been ordered by Bus Vannin.

Prior to Wrightbus entering administration, Arriva Yorkshire took delivery of an order of low-height StreetDecks built to Arriva Sapphire specification. Arriva cancelled seven of this batch following the period of administration, and a year later, these seven buses were sold to Ensignbus. The company later bought 14 new Streetdecks built to full-height Ensignbus specification. Arriva Merseyside took delivery of 24 low-height Streetdeck Ultroliners in January 2022, which entered service on two routes serving Liverpool and other surrounding areas. Arriva Merseyside had previously ordered 51 visually similar Wright Gemini 3 low-height buses built on the Volvo B5LH chassis, which were delivered between 2016 and 2017. 

Another significant operator of StreetDecks is the Rotala Group, who purchased thirteen StreetDecks from a cancelled First Leeds order for Diamond North West in 2020. The group would subsequently order 139 more StreetDecks in 2020, with the majority being delivered to Diamond North West to replace vehicles leased from First Greater Manchester. The remaining four from this order were delivered to Preston Bus.

StreetDeck HEV 

The hybrid-electric (HEV) variant of the StreetDeck was launched in 2018 alongside the Wright StreetLite Max Hybrid, with the first 13 StreetDeck HEVs entering service with First South Yorkshire alongside an order of Streetlites at the Olive Grove Depot in May 2018. Later that month, eight StreetDeck HEVs also entered service on First West Yorkshire's Elland Road park & ride service in Leeds.

Outside of the FirstGroup, the Oxford Bus Company took delivery of 6 StreetDeck HEVs in 2018 for Brookesbus services U1 and U5. A StreetDeck HEV was delivered to the Belfast Metro, while in London, StreetDeck HEVs were delivered to Tower Transit and Go-Ahead London.

StreetDeck Hydroliner FCEV 

The hydrogen fuel cell (FCEV) variant of the StreetDeck was unveiled at the Euro Bus Expo in October 2018. It is the first hydrogen-powered double decker bus which has been built with a range of 280 miles, using a fuel cell system made by Ballard with a Siemens drivetrain; the bus was later named the StreetDeck Hydroliner in June 2021. Orders were placed in May 2019 by Transport for London for 20 of these to enter service in 2020, however these orders were interrupted due to the temporary collapse of Wrightbus when it fell into administration in the same year. These were eventually delivered to Metroline and entered service on route 7 in May 2021.

Further orders were first made by First Aberdeen for 15 StreetDeck Hydroliners in March 2020, which entered service in January 2021, while National Express West Midlands ordered 20 buses in October 2020, which were delivered throughout 2021 and entered service in the December of that year. Three more of the type entered service with Translink in December 2020; a further 23 were ordered in December 2021 and began to enter service from March 2022.

StreetDeck Electroliner BEV 

The Battery electric (BEV) variant of the StreetDeck was launched at the Itthub Conference in June 2021. The company claims the Electroliner has a range of 200 miles with a battery capacity of 454 kWh. In 2022, Wrightbus claimed that the Electroliner BEV had been certified as the most efficient battery electric double decker bus in the world following tests at the French automotive testing centre . Batteries are from French battery company Forsee Power.

Translink ordered 80 StreetDeck Electroliners as part of a £74 million zero-emissions fleet investment in 2021. The first of these Electroliners entered service in Belfast with Translink Metro in March 2022. An additional ten Electroliners for the Foyle Metro are expected to enter service in 2023, while 50 more Electroliners have been ordered for delivery to both Metro and Ulsterbus by summer 2024.

Abellio London ordered 30 StreetDeck Electroliners for their operation of route 111, which will enter service to replace London United buses currently contracted to the route. These will be the first electric double-decker buses manufactured by Wrightbus to be delivered to a TfL operator and will be built with high specification interiors similar to Abellio's 'Future Bus' Alexander Dennis Enviro400EVs on route 63. Arriva London have ordered sixteen StreetDeck Electroliners for use on route 307, and Metroline have ordered 39 StreetDeck Electroliners for use on routes 142 and 297, with these orders due for delivery in 2023.

The FirstGroup ordered 20 StreetDeck Electroliners in August 2022 as part of a larger investment in battery electric buses, which will also see 173 Wright GB Kite Electroliners enter service with operators within the group. Further StreetDeck Electroliners were ordered in March 2023, with 55 to be delivered to First Eastern Counties, 25 to be delivered to First Leeds and nine to be delivered to First York by March 2024.

Arriva Midlands have also ordered 22 StreetDeck Electroliners for service in Leicester, which are scheduled to enter service in October 2023. The Oxford Bus Company, meanwhile, is to receive 91 StreetDeck Electroliners as part of an order of 104 zero-emission Wrightbus buses, the largest zero-emission bus order by a Go-Ahead Group company to date.

Glasgow City Sightseeing operator West Coast Motors ordered ten open top StreetDeck Electroliners for delivery in July 2023, which will be the first zero emissions buses globally for a City Sightseeing operation. The Oxford Bus Company is also to receive eight open top StreetDeck Electroliners for its City Sightseeing services.

Exports
In 2018 a demonstrator equipped with Daimler OM936LA 295 hp engine was exported to Hong Kong and placed in service with Kowloon Motor Bus in 2019. However, the demonstrator was sent back to UK in February 2020. 

Five StreetDecks were exported to Monterrey, Mexico in 2017. Although Mexico drives on the right, they were built as right-hand drive vehicles to operate on the Ecovía bus rapid transit corridor, in which passengers board from the left-hand side of the road. These were laid up out of service in 2019 due to damage from being fuelled with inadequate fuel mixtures. A left-hand drive StreetDeck demonstrator would later enter service in Santiago, Chile in March 2019.

The National Transport Authority of Ireland plans to place 800 StreetDeck Electroliners into service across Ireland between 2023 and 2028 as part of a single-supplier agreement with Wrightbus. 120 Electroliners from this agreement have been ordered for delivery in 2023, with 100 due for Dublin Bus and the remaining 20 due for Bus Éireann services in Limerick.

See also 

 Wright Eclipse Gemini
 List of buses

Competitors:

 Alexander Dennis Enviro400 MMC
 Alexander Dennis Enviro500 MMC
 Optare MetroDecker

References

External links 

Double-decker buses
Low-floor buses
Vehicles introduced in 2014
StreetDeck
Battery electric buses
Hybrid electric buses
Fuel cell buses